Yael Castiglione (born 27 September 1985) is an Argentine volleyball player currently playing for MKS Dąbrowa Górnicza of the Polish Orlen Liga.

Career 
Castiglione has represented the Argentina national team in various tournaments since 2004, including the Pan-American Volleyball Cup (in 2008, 2011, 2012, 2013, 2014, 2015, 2016), the FIVB Volleyball World Grand Prix (in 2011, 2012, 2013, 2014, 2015, 2016), the FIVB Volleyball Women's World Cup (in 2011, 2015), the 2014 FIVB Volleyball Women's World Championship in Italy, the 2015 Pan American Games in Canada, and the 2016 Summer Olympics in Brazil. During the Olympics she married the retired Brazilian volleyball player  Marcus Eloe in a Buddhist ceremony.

At club level she played for Millenium, Bellinzona, Lleida, Boca Juniors, Igtisadchi Baku, Dinamo București, Hainaut, Post Schwechat, Maranhão Vôlei, Rio do Sul and Bielsko-Biała before moving to Dąbrowa Górnicza in May 2016.

Clubs
  CV Millenium Cermel (2005–2006)
  Volley Bellinzona (2006–2007)
  Cecell Lleida  (2007–2009)
  Boca Juniors (2009–2010)
  İqtisadçı Bakı (2010–2011)
  CS Dinamo București (2011–2012)
  Hainaut Volley (2012–2012)
  SVS Post Schwechat (2012–2013)
  Maranhão Vôlei (2013–2014)
  Rio do Sul Vôlei (2014–2015)
  BKS Stal Bielsko-Biała (2015–2016)
  MKS Dąbrowa Górnicza (2016–present)

References

External links
 Profile at FIVB
 Profile at CEV
 Player profile  at Orlen Liga
Player profile at Instagram

1985 births
Living people
Argentine women's volleyball players
Volleyball players from Buenos Aires
Volleyball players at the 2015 Pan American Games
Pan American Games competitors for Argentina
Volleyball players at the 2016 Summer Olympics
Olympic volleyball players of Argentina
Setters (volleyball)